is a Japanese professional footballer who plays as a forward or a winger for  club Kawasaki Frontale.

Club statistics
.

References

External links

 Profile at Thespakusatsu Gunma

1994 births
Living people
Meiji University alumni
Association football people from Tokyo
Japanese footballers
J1 League players
J2 League players
Thespakusatsu Gunma players
Omiya Ardija players
Kashiwa Reysol players
Shonan Bellmare players
Kawasaki Frontale players
Association football midfielders